John Crossley (16 May 1812 – 16 April 1879) was a Liberal Party politician in the United Kingdom. He served from 1874 to 1877 as MP for Halifax in West Yorkshire.

He was the eldest son of John Crossley (1772–1837) and his wife Martha Turner. Crossley was a successful carpet manufacturer, whose business (John Crossley and Sons) became a major employer in Halifax. In the early 1870s he set up the American Linoleum Company at Linoleumville, New York with Frederick Walton, the inventor of linoleum; the company was highly successful. He was the elder brother of Sir Francis Crossley (1817–1872), who had served as the constituency's MP from 1852 to 1859.

Honours
A blue plaque was erected by the Halifax Civic Trust.

References

Crossley family tree

External links 

 

1812 births
Liberal Party (UK) MPs for English constituencies
UK MPs 1874–1880
1879 deaths
People from Halifax, West Yorkshire